Baturalp Ünlü (born 9 July 2002) is a Turkish swimmer. He competed in the men's 200 metre freestyle event at the 2020 European Aquatics Championships, in Budapest, Hungary.

References

External links
 

2002 births
Living people
Turkish male freestyle swimmers
Swimmers at the 2020 Summer Olympics
Olympic swimmers of Turkey
Georgia Tech Yellow Jackets men's swimmers
21st-century Turkish people
Mediterranean Games medalists in swimming
Mediterranean Games bronze medalists for Turkey
Swimmers at the 2022 Mediterranean Games